Aurora Publishing was a German-Hungarian publishing company, established in 1963 in Munich by József Molnár. It published 2 to 3 volumes annually, which, until 1983, were printed in-house. They published some 60 volumes until 1990, and the volumes are grouped into sets, "Aurora Kiskönyvtár" and "Aurora Kiskönyvek". Molnár also published a series on church history entitled Dissertationes Hungaricae ex historia Ecclesiae. In some volumes, Aurora Publishing is sometimes simply listed as Aurora or even as Molnár Ny (=Molnár Nyomda) or Molnár. The reason for the existence of Aurora disappeared with the  fall of communism. Molnár endeavoured to publish the works of contemporary émigré Hungarian authors, including:

 Gyula Borbándi
 György Ferdinándy
 Gyula Gombos
 Győző Határ
 Elemér Illyés
 István Jákli
 Oszkár Jászi
 Vilmos Juhász
 Alajos Kannás
 Varga Sándor Kibédi
 Menyhért Kiss
 Valéria Korek
 Géza Lakatos
 Lajos Major-Zala
 Csaba Mánfai
 Póli Marczali
 Margit Mikes
 Ágnes Mirtse
 Dezső Monoszlóy
 Jenő Muzsnay
 Kázmér Nagy
 Béla Padányi-Gulyás
 Rezső Peéry
 Gábor Salacz
 Mátyás Sárközi
 Vilmos Schidt
 László Cs. Szabó
 József Szamosi
 Ferenc Tolvaly
 Györgyi Vándor

References

Further reading
 Új magyar irodalmi lexikon I. (A–Gy). Főszerk. Péter László. Budapest: Akadémiai. 1994. 75. o. 

Publishing companies of Hungary
Publishing companies established in 1963
1963 establishments in West Germany